National Tertiary Route 752, or just Route 752 (or ) is a National Road Route of Costa Rica, located in the Alajuela province.

Description
In Alajuela province the route covers San Carlos canton (Monterrey, Pocosol districts).

References

Highways in Costa Rica